The 2022–23 New Jersey Devils season is the 49th season for the National Hockey League franchise that was established on June 11, 1974, and 41st season since the franchise relocated from Colorado prior to the 1982–83 NHL season.

Standings

Divisional standings

Conference standings

Schedule and results

Preseason
The preseason schedule was published on June 28, 2022.

Regular season
The regular season schedule was published on July 6, 2022.

Player statistics
As of March 19, 2023

Skaters

Goaltenders

Roster

Transactions
The Devils have been involved in the following transactions during the 2022–23 season.

Trades

Free agents

Waivers

Contract terminations

Retirement

Signings

Draft picks

Below are the New Jersey Devils' selections at the 2022 NHL Entry Draft, which was held on July 7 and 8, 2022, at Bell Centre in Montreal.

Notes:
 The Washington Capitals' second-round pick went to the New Jersey Devils as the result of a trade on July 8, 2022, that sent second-round and third-round picks in 2022 to Washington in exchange for Vitek Vanecek and this pick.
 The New York Islanders' fourth-round pick went to the New Jersey Devils as the result of a trade on April 7, 2021, that sent Kyle Palmieri and Travis Zajac to New York in exchange for A. J. Greer, Mason Jobst, a conditional 2022 fourth-round pick and this pick.
 The Edmonton Oilers' fourth-round pick went to the New Jersey Devils as the result of a trade on April 12, 2021, that sent Dmitry Kulikov to Edmonton in exchange for this pick (being conditional at the time of the trade).
 The Columbus Blue Jackets' fifth-round pick went to the New Jersey Devils as the result of a trade on February 25, 2019, that sent Keith Kinkaid to Columbus in exchange for this pick.

Notes

References

New Jersey Devils seasons
New Jersey Devils
New Jersey Devils
New Jersey Devils
New Jersey Devils
21st century in Newark, New Jersey